Sir Thomas Edgar Halsey, 3rd Baronet, DSO (28 November 1898 – 30 August 1970) was an English cricketer, naval officer (1916–1946), and Deputy Lieutenant of Hertfordshire.

A right-handed batsman and right-arm fast bowler, he played first-class cricket between 1920 and 1928 and also represented the Egypt national cricket team.

Early life
Born in South Mimms in 1898, Halsey was the elder son of Sir Walter Halsey, 2nd Baronet, and his wife Agnes Marion, the daughter of William Macalpine Leny. He was educated at Eton College and Jesus College, Cambridge. He was already a lieutenant in the Royal Navy when he went up to Cambridge.

Cricketer
Halsey was a right-handed batsman and right-arm fast bowler.

He played cricket for Eton in 1915 and 1916, but it was for the Royal Navy cricket team that he made his first-class debut, playing against his university side during the 1920 English cricket season.

He played twice for the university cricket team in 1920, but did not gain his blue. The rest of his first-class matches were all for the Royal Navy, mostly against the British Army cricket team, though there were also matches against the RAF and New Zealand.

He began to play minor counties cricket for Hertfordshire in 1921, continuing to play for them until 1932, a year in which he played for the Navy against a combined South America team. In 1936, he played for Egypt against HM Martineau's XI, captaining the side and scoring a century in the first innings.

Naval officer

HMS Hawkins (cruiser) (China Station) 30 Apr 1925 – May 1926
HMS Victory 31 Jan 1927 – Jul 1927
HMS Effingham (cruiser) (East Indies Station) 1 Feb 1929 – Feb 1931
HMY Victoria and Albert (Royal yacht) 20 Jan 1932 – Jan 1934
Commanding Officer, HMS Boadicea (destroyer) (Mediterranean Fleet) 3 Aug 1934 – Feb 1936
Senior Officers' War Course (HMS President) 12 October 1936 – Feb 1937
an Assistant to Naval Assistant to Second Sea Lord (HMS President) 8 Mar 1937 – Apr 1939
Commanding Officer, the destroyer HMS Malcolm (flotilla leader) & Captain (D), 16th Destroyer Flotilla, 31 Jul 1939 – 25 Jun 1940 & 12 Aug 1940 – 22 Oct 1940.
HMS Badger (RN base, Harwich), Feb 1941–4 Feb 1942
Naval Officer-in-Charge, Isle of Man & CO Training establishment HMS St George, Douglas, Isle of Man 4 Feb 1942–(08.1942)
Flag Captain, the battleship , 15 Feb 1943 – 10 Apr 1945.
Commodore RNAS Lee-on-Solent (HMS Daedalus) 1945–1946

He was appointed a Companion of the Distinguished Service Order (DSO) on 7 June 1940 "for good services in the withdrawal of the Allied Armies from the beaches at Dunkirk".

County officer
Halsey retired from the Navy with the rank of captain in 1946, and went on to serve as Deputy Lieutenant for Herts from 1948, a JP from 1950, County Councillor from 1953, and Vice-Lieutenant for Herts from 1957 until his death at Hemel Hempstead in 1970.

Marriage and children
Halsey married Jean Margaret Palmer, daughter of Bertram Brooke, onetime Tuan Muda of Sarawak, and through him, granddaughter of the second White Rajah of Sarawak, Charles Brooke. They had one son and two daughters.

See also
Halsey Baronets

References

1898 births
1970 deaths
People from Potters Bar
People educated at Eton College
Alumni of Jesus College, Cambridge
Cambridge University cricketers
Egyptian cricketers
English cricketers
Royal Navy officers of World War I
Royal Navy officers of World War II
Royal Navy cricketers
Baronets in the Baronetage of the United Kingdom
Deputy Lieutenants of Hertfordshire
Hertfordshire cricketers
Thomas